Domohani Kelejora High School-[DKHS] is a Bengali medium school in Domohani Bazar, Asansol, West Bengal, India, established in 1938, which offers vocational education.

Domohani Kelejora High School runs in a government school building. The school has 25 classrooms, computer facility, scientific laboratory facility and a playground. The school teaches classes 5 through 12.

References 

High schools and secondary schools in West Bengal
Schools in Paschim Bardhaman district
Education in Asansol
Educational institutions established in 1938
1938 establishments in India